Andrews & Arnold Ltd (also known as AAISP, or A&A) is an Internet service provider based in Bracknell, England. The company was founded in 1997 and launched in 1998, serving businesses and "technical" home users.

The company primarily operates as a reseller of connectivity products in the UK and utilises a number of wholesale providers. The company initially only offered services over BT Wholesale, then in 2013 began offering services over Talktalk Wholesale. Typically in the UK, ADSL, FTTC and FTTP lines are served from the same local Openreach infrastructure, although A&A's use of multiple carriers enables diverse backhaul from telephone exchanges using TalkTalk's LLU presence.

In November 2022, Andrews & Arnold began offering FTTP services over the Cityfibre network in England and Wales, marking their first services that do not make use of the Openreach network.

The company was judged as the best niche internet service provider according to the Thinkbroadband Customer Service Awards in 2010. In 2021, it was voted as the best broadband provider in the UK on the ISPreview website.

Andrews & Arnold strongly opposes censorship of Internet connections. In 2015–2017, Kennard published several blog posts discussing why Internet censorship as discussed in the UK is not workable, providing background for AAISP's decision to not censor their customers' connections.

Technology 
The company's owner, Adrian Kennard, stated in a blog post that as of October 2010, the company is "xkcd/806" compliant, referring to xkcd comic number 806. This means that technical support callers who say the code word "shibboleet" will be transferred to a technical support representative who knows at least two programming languages, and presumably can offer more useful advice than a standard tech support script.

Andrews & Arnold provides optional bonded multiple-link internet access. This allows multiple links to be used together to increase speed and reliability. Special routers distribute individual IP packets between the available links if even one download or upload operation will benefit, and it is not necessary to have several users, running programs or computers to gain the speed benefit. Links can be of different types; each needs only to be a pipe that can carry IP packets. Multiple links can either be used together all the time, or some can be brought up if other links fail (a 'failover' mechanism), or a combination of the two approaches can be set up.

Products
Andrews & Arnold have a number of product areas:

 Internet access
 FTTC and FTTP
 ADSL
 VDSL
 L2TP tunnelling service
 4G/3G data SIMs
 Copper lines for DSL
 Multiline bonded internet connections
 Leased lines
 Ethernet (2 Mbit/s – 1 Gbit/s)
 Domain and hosting services
 Colocation
 Domain names
 Email services
Voice
 SIP trunking
 VOIP – Voice over Internet Protocol
 SIP2SIM – Makes a mobile phone a SIP endpoint
Hardware
 Firebrick Ethernet router (to rent or buy, manufactured by subsidiary Firebrick Ltd)

References

Internet service providers of the United Kingdom
Companies based in Bracknell